Glen Seward Foster II (August 14, 1930 – October 1, 1999) was an American sailor. He won a bronze medal in the Tempest class with Peter Dean at the 1972 Summer Olympics.

In 1971, when he won the national and world championships in the Tempest Class.

References

External links 

 
 
 

1930 births
1999 deaths
American male sailors (sport)
Tempest class sailors
5.5 Metre class sailors
Olympic bronze medalists for the United States in sailing
Sailors at the 1972 Summer Olympics – Tempest
Medalists at the 1972 Summer Olympics
World champions in sailing for the United States
World Champions in 5.5 Metre
People from Orange, New Jersey
Deaths from esophageal cancer
Brown Bears sailors